The Nature Road Bridge is a bridge that crosses the Mississippi River in the U.S. state of Minnesota.

See also
List of crossings of the Upper Mississippi River

Road bridges in Minnesota
Bridges over the Mississippi River
Concrete bridges in the United States
Girder bridges in the United States
Buildings and structures in Morrison County, Minnesota